Oxidoreductase NAD-binding domain  is an evolutionary conserved protein domain.
   
Xanthine dehydrogenases, that also bind FAD/NAD, have essentially no similarity.                                                      
                              
Bacterial ferredoxin-NADP+ reductase may be bound to the thylakoid membrane or anchored to the thylakoid-bound phycobilisomes. Chloroplast ferredoxin-NADP+ reductase may play a key role in regulating the relative amounts of cyclic and non-cyclic electron flow to meet the demands of the plant for ATP and reducing power. It is involved in the final step in the linear photosynthetic electron transport chain and has also been implicated in cyclic electron flow around photosystem I where its role would be to return electrons from ferredoxin to the cytochrome B-F complex.

This domain is present in a variety of proteins that include, bacterial flavohemoprotein, mammalian NADH-cytochrome b5 reductase, eukaryotic NADPH-cytochrome P450 reductase, nitrate reductase from plants, nitric-oxide synthase, bacterial vanillate demethylase and others.

Examples 

Human genes encoding proteins containing this domain include:
 CYB5R1;    CYB5R2;    CYB5R4;    MTRR;      
 NDOR1;     NOS1;      NOS2A;     NOS3;
 OXNAD1;    POR;

References 

Protein domains
Single-pass transmembrane proteins